United States Atlantic Command (acronym from 1947-1993 USLANTCOM, after 1993 USACOM) was a Unified Combatant Command of the United States Department of Defense. In 1999, U.S. Atlantic Command was renamed and given a new mission as United States Joint Forces Command.

USLANTCOM was active from the 1947 to 1993 as a primarily U.S. Navy command, focused upon the wartime defense of the Atlantic sea lanes against Soviet attack, with the U.S. Atlantic Fleet and other subunified commands such as the Iceland Defense Force under its authority. The Navy's leading place within the command had been marked by having Commander-in-Chief U.S. Atlantic Fleet, CINCLANTFLT acting also as the Commander-in-Chief United States Atlantic Command between 1947 and 1985. CINCLANTFLT, in addition to the LANTCOM post, also held the position of NATO's Supreme Allied Commander Atlantic (SACLANT). There were also Army and Air Force components, CINCARLANT and CINCAFLANT; these posts were allocated to Commanding General, CONARC, and Commander, Tactical Air Command, during the Cuban Missile Crisis.

The beginning of the Congo Crisis in mid 1960 shift planners' attention to potential tasks in Central Africa. In November 1960, the Secretary of Defense gave CINCLANT the responsibility for sub-Saharan Africa plans and operations, and instructed CINCLANT to establish a small headquarters, Joint Task Force 4, under an Army lieutenant general. Lieutenant General Louis W. Truman served as Commander JTF-4. Several months later, in response to a JCS request, Secretary Robert S. McNamara changed the Unified Command Plan's wording so that CINCLANT no longer bore responsibility for "routine" matters in sub-Saharan Africa but was, instead, responsible for contingency planning and for commanding any JCS-directed operations. In July 1961 Secretary McNamara apportioned sub-Saharan responsibilities as follows: Military Assistance Program (MAP) to USCINCEUR and the Secretary of the Army, Congo air evacuation to USCINCEUR, and the Congo sea evacuation to CINCLANT.

After the end of the Cold War, a 1993 reorganization gave the Command a new acronym, USACOM, and brought United States Army Forces Command and Air Combat Command under its authority. In 1999, USACOM was renamed and given a new mission as United States Joint Forces Command (USJFCOM). USJFCOM was closed in 2011.

List of Combatant Commanders

References

Atlantic Command
Military units and formations in Virginia
Military units and formations established in 1947
Military units and formations disestablished in 1999